The 38th Cannes Film Festival was held from 8 to 20 May 1985. The Palme d'Or went to the When Father Was Away on Business by Emir Kusturica.

The festival opened with Witness, directed by Peter Weir and closed with The Emerald Forest, directed by John Boorman. The festival paid a tribute to American actor James Stewart and screened a restored version of his 1954 film The Glenn Miller Story, directed by Anthony Mann.

Juries

Main competition
The following people were appointed as the Jury of the 1985 feature film competition:
Miloš Forman (Czechoslovakia) Jury President
Claude Imbert (France) (journalist)
Edwin Zbonek (Austria)
Francis Veber (France)
Jorge Amado (Brazil)
Mauro Bolognini (Italy)
Michel Perez (France)
Mo Rothman (USA)
Néstor Almendros (Spain)
Sarah Miles (UK)

Camera d'Or
The following people were appointed as the Jury of the 1985 Camera d'Or:
Bernard Jubard
Bertrand Van Effenterre (director)
Joël Magny (critic)
Jose Vieira Marques (cinephile)
Lorenzo Codelli (journalist)
Peter Cowie (film historian)

Official selection

In competition - Feature film
The following feature films competed for the Palme d'Or:

Un Certain Regard
The following films were selected for the competition of Un Certain Regard:

 A.K. by Chris Marker
 Ad Sof Halaylah by Eitan Green
 Dear, Dearest, Beloved, Unique... (Milyy, dorogoy, lyubimyy, edinstvennyy...) by Dinara Asanova
 Il diavolo sulle colline by Vittorio Cottafavi
 Empty Quarter: A Woman in Africa (Une femme en Afrique) by Raymond Depardon
 Fire Festival (Himatsuri) by Mitsuo Yanagimachi
 Heritage (Dediščina) by Matjaž Klopčič
 Latino by Haskell Wexler
 Das Mal des Todes by Peter Handke
 Monsieur de Pourceaugnac by Michel Mitrani
 The Mystery of Alexina (Le mystère Alexina) by René Féret
 Oriana by Fina Torres
 Padre nuestro by Francisco Regueiro
 A Private Function by Malcolm Mowbray
 Tea in the Harem (Le thé au harem d'Archimède) by Mehdi Charef
 Tokyo-Ga by Wim Wenders

Films out of competition
The following films were selected to be screened out of competition:

 The Emerald Forest by John Boorman
 The Glenn Miller Story by Anthony Mann
 Jumping by Osamu Tezuka
 Die Nacht by Hans-Jürgen Syberberg
 Night Magic by Lewis Furey
 The Purple Rose of Cairo by Woody Allen
 The Satin Slipper (Le soulier de Satin) by Manoel de Oliveira
 Steaming by Joseph Losey
 Witness by Peter Weir

Short film competition
The following short films competed for the Short Film Palme d'Or:
 L'anniversaire de Georges by Patrick Traon
 Mariage (Jenitba) by Slav Bakalov and Rumen Petkov
 Stop by Krzysztof Kiwerski
 Tusagi by Bondo Shoshitaishvili

Parallel sections

International Critics' Week
The following feature films were screened for the 24th International Critics' Week (24e Semaine de la Critique):

 Le Temps détruit by Pierre Beuchot (France)
 Faces of Women (Visages de femmes) by Desiré Ecaré (Ivory Coast)
 Kolp by Roland Suso Richter (West Germany)
 Vertiges by Christine Laurent (France)
 The Color of Blood by Bill Duke (United States)
 Fucha by Michał Dudziewicz (Poland)
 A Canary Cage by Pavel Chukhray (Soviet Union)
 A Marvada Carne by André Klotzel (Brazil)

Directors' Fortnight
The following films were screened for the 1985 Directors' Fortnight (Quinzaine des Réalizateurs):

 A Flash of Green by Victor Nuñez
 Crossover Dreams by Leon Ichaso
 Da Capo by Pekka Lehto, Pirjo Honkasalo
 Dance with a Stranger by Mike Newell
 Desperately Seeking Susan by Susan Seidelman
 Dim Sum: A Little Bit of Heart by Wayne Wang
 Love on the Pyramids Plateau (Al Hob Fawk Habadet al Haram) by Atef El Tayeb
 A Suspended Life (Ghazal el-Banat) by Jocelyne Saab
 Blue Mountains by Eldar Shengelaia
 Impiegati by Pupi Avati
 The City and the Dogs (La ciudad y los perros) by Francisco J. Lombardi
 La noche más hermosa by Manuel Gutiérrez Aragón
 Les anges by Ridha Behi
 Lieber Karl by Maria Knilli
 Megfelelo Ember Kenyes Feladatra by János Kovácsi
 O Erotas tou Odyssea by Vassilis Vafeas
 The Funeral (Osōshiki) by Juzo Itami
 The Innocent by John Mackenzie

Awards

Official awards
The following films and people received the 1985 Official selection awards:
Palme d'Or: When Father Was Away on Business by Emir Kusturica
Grand Prix: Birdy by Alan Parker
Best Director: André Téchiné for Rendez-vous
Best Actress: 
Norma Aleandro for The Official Story 
Cher for Mask
Best Actor: William Hurt for Kiss of the Spider Woman
Best Artistic Contribution: Paul Schrader for Mishima: A Life in Four Chapters
Jury Prize: Colonel Redl by István Szabó
Golden Camera
Caméra d'Or: Oriana by Fina Torres
Short films
Short Film Palme d'Or: Mariage (Jenitba) by Slav Bakalov and Rumen Petkov

Independent awards
FIPRESCI Prizes
When Father Was Away on Business (Otac na sluzbenom putu) by Emir Kusturica (In competition)
The Purple Rose of Cairo by Woody Allen (Out of competition)
Faces of Women (Visages de femmes) by Desiré Ecaré (International Critics' Week)
Commission Supérieure Technique
 Technical Grand Prize: Insignificance by Nicolas Roeg
Ecumenical Jury
 Prize of the Ecumenical Jury: The Official Story (La historia oficial) by Norma Aleandro
Award of the Youth
Foreign Film: Dance with a Stranger by Mike Newell
French Film: Tea in the Harem (Le thé au harem d'Archimède) by Mehdi Charef

References

Media
INA: Opening of the 1985 Festival (commentary in French)
INA: List of winners of the 1985 festival (commentary in French)

External links
1985 Cannes Film Festival (web.archive)
Official website Retrospective 1985 
Cannes Film Festival Awards for 1985 at Internet Movie Database

Cannes Film Festival
Cannes Film Festival
Cannes Film Festival
Cannes